Antodice quadrimaculata is a species of beetle in the family Cerambycidae. It was described by Martins and Galileo in 2003.

References

Antodice
Beetles described in 2003